Darkan or Derkan or Darakan may refer to:
 Darkan, Isfahan
 Darkan, Sistan and Baluchestan